Capillaria gastrica is a parasitic nematode in the genus Capillaria. Among the known host species are the marsh rice rat (Oryzomys palustris) and deermouse (Peromyscus maniculatus).

See also 
 List of parasites of the marsh rice rat

References

Literature cited 
Kinsella, J.M. 1988. Comparison of helminths of rice rats, Oryzomys palustris, from freshwater and saltwater marshes in Florida. Proceedings of the Helminthological Society of Washington 55(2):275–280.
Pulido-Flores, G., Moreno-Flores, S. and Monks, S. 2005. Helminths of rodents (Rodentia: Muridae) from Metztitlán, San Cristóbal, and Rancho Santa Elena, Hidalgo, Mexico (subscription required). Comparative Parasitology 72(2):186–192.

Enoplia
Nematodes described in 1926
Parasites of rodents
Parasitic nematodes of mammals